South Ari Atoll MPA (Marine Protected Area) is an area from the north western tip of the reef crest of Rangali island up to the North Eastern tip of Dhigurah island, the boundary extending 1 km seaward from the epipelagic reef fringe. This area is now known as the South Ari Marine Park. The total length of this MPA is 42km. The width is 1km from the outer reef of the islands.  

Special features:  Globally significant aggregation area for the whale shark, Rhincodon typus. Provide a means to promote and ensure the long term conservation and protection of the South Ari Atoll ecosystem and all species that rely upon it.

This area was first declared to be protected in 2009, although a proper management plan was established in July 2019. The government of Maldives hired rangers to operate in this area, in order to make the management plan a success. Certain rules and regulations are set within the boundary of this MPA. 

Atolls of the Maldives